Swedish overseas colonies consisted of the overseas colonies controlled by Sweden. Sweden possessed overseas colonies from 1638 to 1663, in 1733 and from 1784 to 1878. Sweden possessed five colonies, four of which were short lived. The colonies spanned three continents: Africa, Asia and North America.

List
The former Swedish colonies in Africa were:
Swedish Gold Coast (1650–1663; lost to Denmark and the Dutch) Including the Cape Coast (1649–1663) consisting of the following settlements:
Fort Apollonia, presently Beyin: 1655–1657.
Fort Christiansborg/Fort Frederiksborg, which became the capital, presently Osu: 1652–1658 
Fort Batenstein, presently Butri: 1649–1656.
Fort Witsen, presently Takoradi: 1653–1658.
Carolusborg: April 1650 – January/February 1658, 10 December 1660 – 22 April 1663

The former Swedish colonies in the Americas:
New Sweden (1638–1655; lost to the Dutch)
Saint-Barthélemy (1784–1878; sold to France)
Guadeloupe (1813–1814; returned to France)
                                                                                       
The former Swedish colonies in Asia were:                                  
Parangipettai (1733; lost to the French and British East India Companies)

Americas

New Sweden

By the middle of the 17th century, the Swedish Empire had reached its greatest territorial extent. The Swedes sought to extend their influence by creating an agricultural (tobacco) and fur trading colony to bypass French, English and Dutch merchants. The charter included Swedish, Dutch and German stockholders. Once they landed they established Fort Christina (now Wilmington, Delaware), named after Queen Christina of Sweden. Many of the settlers were Finnish, since until 1809 the area of modern Finland was the eastern third of the kingdom of Sweden.

The settlement was actually an invasion of New Netherland since it was Dutch territory. The founder and first governor, Peter Minuit, had been Director-General of New Netherland from 1626 to 1633. Disgruntled after being dismissed from his post, he led a Swedish expedition to a location which he knew to be strategic as well as a thorn in the side of his former employers. Minuit died on a return trip from Stockholm in a hurricane near the Caribbean island of Saint Kitts. The colony would establish Fort Nya Elfsborg north of present-day Salem, New Jersey, in 1643.
 
In May 1654, the Dutch Fort Casimir, located in present-day New Castle, Delaware, was captured by New Sweden. As a reprisal, the Dutch governor Peter Stuyvesant sent an army to the Delaware River, which obtained the surrender of the Swedish forts.

Antillian possessions
Saint Barthélemy is the only Caribbean island to have been historically a Swedish colony for any significant length of time, Guadeloupe only having been one briefly, at the end of the Napoleonic Wars.

As a result of Sweden's support of France's enemies during the Napoleonic Wars, the island of Guadeloupe was ceded to king Charles XIV John personally, not to his Swedish state. However a year later  the island was given to France by the Treaty of Paris. Sweden then forced a settlement with the British government because it had been guaranteed the island which was strategically close to its other Caribbean colony. This led to the Guadeloupe Fund which guaranteed Sweden 24 million francs. Because of how the money was used, Sweden was then given an additional 300,000 Riksdaler under the Riksdag of 1815  every year. The last installment was paid in 1983.

In addition to these the Swedes briefly attempted to settle Tobago in 1733, but were driven away by native tribes, and Tobago was eventually claimed by the British.

Saint Barthélemy
During the time of Sweden's colonisation of Africa's Gold Coast, the small Swedish slave trade began.  However, after the fall of New Sweden to the Dutch, the slave trade ended. It would later be rejuvenated in 1784, when Sweden's monarch, Gustav III, began negotiations with France with a view to creating a new alliance between the two countries. Gustav offered Gothenburg as an entrepôt to the French, in exchange for the Caribbean colony of Saint Barthélemy, in addition to subsidies. Although Sweden was successful in acquiring the island in 1784, the population of the colony was less than 1000 people, and neither were particularly propitious trading ports—sugar and cotton only provided four shiploads a year, and many of the other resources were only produced in large enough quantities to provide subsistence for the inhabitants.

However, the islands were close to the British and French trading posts of the Leeward and Windward islands. A new town was also constructed, Gustavia (named after the king), and this facilitated trade. Within a year, the population had doubled and the king saw fit to form the Swedish West India Company. The Napoleonic Wars (1803–1815) benefitted trade, as did the opening of free trade with Sweden in 1806; the population had continued to increase, reaching approximately 5000 by 1800. With the exception of a brief period of British occupation from 1801 to 1802, the colonies continued to grow. In 1811, 1800 ships visited Saint Barthélemy; and from October 1813 to September 1814, 20% of the U.S.'s exports passed through the island.

The island was notable for its liberalism, particularly in regards to religious toleration. In Sweden, Lutheranism was strictly adhered to; people were obligated to attend a number of church services a year, and adherence to other religions or denominations was against the law (conversion to Catholicism, for example, often led to people being exiled). However, these two islands were inhabited by such a diverse group of people from European backgrounds, that French and English were also accepted official languages. On Saint Barthélemy, in 1787, only 21 Lutherans resided there, compared to over 500 Catholics, as well as several hundred people from different Protestant denominations. The government did not seek to suppress this: indeed, they ordered Saint Barthélemy's governor, Rosenstein, to salary a Catholic priest to come from Saint Martin twice a month.

Africa

Sweden temporarily controlled several settlements on the Gold Coast (present Ghana) since 22 April 1650, but lost the last when on 20 April 1663 Fort Carlsborg and the capital Fort Christiansborg were seized by Denmark.

Cape Coast
In 1652, the Swedes took Cape Coast (in modern Ghana) which had previously been under the control of the Dutch and before that the Portuguese. Cape Coast was centered on the Carolusburg Castle which was built in 1653 and named after King Charles X Gustav of Sweden but is now known as the Cape Coast Castle.

India
The Swedish East India Company did not establish any permanent colonies in India, but they briefly possessed a factory in Porto Novo (today Parangipettai, Tamil Nadu). The fort was destroyed a month after its construction by French and British forces.

See also
Swedish colonization of the Americas
Swedish Empire
Swedish East India Company

References

Sources
WorldStatesmen- Swedish Possessions & Colonies
History of Tobago

External links

 Wetaskiwin local heritage – Swedish settlers
 Mémoire St Barth | History of St Barthélemy (archives & history of slavery, slave trade and their abolition) – ''Comité de Liaison et d'Application des Sources Historiques

Former Swedish colonies
Overseas empires
Lists of former colonies
17th century in Sweden
18th century in Sweden
History of European colonialism

1663 disestablishments in the Swedish colonial empire
1784 establishments in the Swedish colonial empire
1878 disestablishments in the Swedish colonial empire
1638 establishments in the Swedish colonial empire